Harriet Slater CBE (née Evans; 1903 – 12 October 1976) was a British Labour and Co-operative politician.

Life and career
Slater, née Evans, was born in Tunstall, Staffordshire, on 3 July 1903. Educated at Hanley High School and Dudley Teachers' Training College, she was National Organiser for the Co-operative Party from 1942 to 1953, and a local councillor in Stoke-on-Trent from 1933 to 1965.

Slater was elected as the Member of Parliament (MP) for Stoke-on-Trent North at a by-election in 1953, and served until her retirement at the 1966 general election. From 1964 to 1966, she was a Government whip, the first woman to become one, with the formal title of Lord of the Treasury.

Ruth Smeeth writes that Slater saw her role in Parliament as "being a practical advocate for the working-class, especially working-class women ... As her parliamentary colleague Laurie Pavitt MP once wrote of her, Harriet was Stoke-on-Trent. She knew what mattered to the people she represented, because she was one of them." Slater's maiden speech was about racial justice, made spontaneously because of her strong feelings about equality.

She was married to Frederick Slater, whom she met through the Co-operative movement.

Slater was granted a life peerage on her retirement from Parliament.

References

External links
Centre for Advancement of Women in politics: Harriet Slater



1903 births
1976 deaths
20th-century British women politicians
Commanders of the Order of the British Empire
Female members of the Parliament of the United Kingdom for English constituencies
Labour Co-operative MPs for English constituencies
Ministers in the Wilson governments, 1964–1970
UK MPs 1951–1955
UK MPs 1955–1959
UK MPs 1959–1964
UK MPs 1964–1966
People from Burslem
20th-century English women
20th-century English people